Coffi Codjia (born December 9, 1967) is a Beninese football referee.

An international referee since 1994, Codjia was a referee at the FIFA World Cup in 2002 and 2006, the FIFA Confederations Cup in 1999 and 2003 and the African Cup of Nations in 2000, 2002, 2004, 2006, 2008, in which he was the referee for the final, and 2010.

Codjia was indefinitely suspended by the Confederation of African Football (CAF) for not taking action against Algeria's Fawzi Chaouchi, who appeared to head-butt him in a semi final of  2010 African Cup of Nations semi-final game against Egypt.  Chaouchi, who was later sent off for a second bookable offence, received a three match ban by CAF for the headbutt.

Codjia was one of the 38 preselected referees for the 2010 FIFA World Cup, but did not make the final list of 30. He returned to international officiating duty in September 2010, refereeing a 2012 Africa Cup of Nations qualifying game between Liberia and Zimbabwe in Monrovia.

References

External links 
FIFA profile 
Reuters profile

1967 births
Living people
Beninese football referees
2002 FIFA World Cup referees
2006 FIFA World Cup referees
AFC Asian Cup referees